James Weaver is a British actor who is usually a guest actor for most of his television work such as; Heartbeat, Outside the Rules, Rose and Malone and The Bill. James also appears regularly in theatrical productions in and around London.

External links

James Weaver's Official Web Site
James Weaver's Official Fan Site

English male television actors
English male stage actors
Living people
Year of birth missing (living people)